Jim Taylor (born 1962) is an American producer and screenwriter who has often collaborated on projects with Alexander Payne. The two are business partners in the Santa Monica based Ad Hominem Enterprises, and are credited as co-writers of six films released between 1996 and 2007: Citizen Ruth (1996),
Election (1999),
Jurassic Park III (2001, with Peter Buchman),
About Schmidt (2002),
Sideways (2004), and
I Now Pronounce You Chuck and Larry (2007, with Barry Fanaro and Lew Gallo). Taylor's credits as a producer include films such as Cedar Rapids and The Descendants.

Early years

Taylor was born in Seattle, Washington. He graduated from Bellevue High School in neighboring Bellevue, and subsequently from Pomona College, a liberal arts school in California that he attended instead of accepting an offer from the USC School of Cinematic Arts.

Career
Taylor began working for Cannon Films in 1987. After visiting China on an Avery Foundation grant, Taylor returned to L.A. and spent three years working with Ivan Passer;  he also worked for Devon Foster, a director at HBO, as Foster's assistant.

Taylor met Payne while working temporary jobs in Los Angeles, eventually moving in with him for financial reasons.  While roommates the two wrote short films and started writing Citizen Ruth. After winning money on the game show Wheel of Fortune, Taylor entered Tisch School of the Arts at the age of 30.  He and Payne did further rewrites on Citizen Ruth while Taylor was a graduate student; the film got made during his third year there.  Taylor received an M.F.A. in Filmmaking from New York University in 1996.

Awards and nominations
Taylor has received numerous awards and nominations (including an Oscar win for co-writing Sideways, two Golden Globe Award wins for co-writing About Schmidt and Sideways, and additional Oscar nominations for co-writing Election and for producing The Descendants); those listed below are for his work on Sideways (all shared with Alexander Payne):

References

External links
 

American male screenwriters
Best Adapted Screenplay Academy Award winners
Best Adapted Screenplay BAFTA Award winners
Independent Spirit Award winners
Writers Guild of America Award winners
Writers from Seattle
1963 births
Living people
Pomona College alumni
Tisch School of the Arts alumni
Best Screenplay Golden Globe winners
Golden Globe Award-winning producers
Screenwriters from California